Edwina Beth "Edy" Williams is an American television and film actor who is best known for her acting work in the films of Russ Meyer, to whom she was married from 1970 to 1975.

Early years
Williams was born in Salt Lake City, Utah, and raised in Southern California. She began her career as a model and beauty pageant contestant. After winning several local pageants, she was signed as a contract player by 20th Century Fox.

Career
Throughout the 1960s, Williams appeared in several television series and films including roles in The Beverly Hillbillies, The Twilight Zone, Batman, Adam-12, Lost in Space, The Naked Kiss, and the Sonny & Cher film, Good Times (1967). In 1970, she appeared as Ashley St. Ives in Russ Meyer's first mainstream film, Beyond the Valley of the Dolls, followed by his second mainstream film, The Seven Minutes (1971). Meyer and Williams married in 1970, shortly after the release of Beyond the Valley of the Dolls.

In March 1973, she was photographed for Playboy in a full color photo spread by then-husband Russ Meyer. After her divorce from Meyer in 1977, Williams continued acting, mainly appearing in films, many of which involved nudity.

In 1982, she appeared on an episode of The People's Court as a defendant in a case titled "The Star Who Wouldn't Pay". She was sued for payment for publicity work the plaintiff had done for her. She counter-sued for half of the retainer she'd paid him. After this, she was sporadically active in films during the 1980s and early 1990s.

Since the 1970s, she has traditionally appeared at both the Academy Awards and the Cannes Film Festival in revealing and flamboyant outfits.

TV and filmography

References

External links 

Official site

Living people
Actresses from Oregon
American film actresses
American television actresses
Actresses from Salt Lake City
21st-century American women
Year of birth missing (living people)